This is a list of high schools in California, public, private and chartered, organized by county and by city or school district. This list includes former high schools.

Alameda County

Alameda Unified School District

Alameda Community Learning Center
Alameda High School
Alameda Science and Technology Institute
Encinal High School
Island High School (continuation school)

Albany Unified School District

Albany High School
MacGregor High School (continuation)

Berkeley Unified School District

Berkeley High School

Castro Valley Unified School District

Castro Valley High School
Redwood Alternative High School (continuation)

Dublin Unified School District

Dublin High School

Emery Unified School District

Emery Secondary School

Fremont Unified School District

American High School
Irvington High School
John F. Kennedy High School
Mission San Jose High School
Washington High School

Hayward Unified School District

Hayward High School
Mount Eden High School
Tennyson High School

Livermore Valley Joint Unified School District

Granada High School
Livermore High School

New Haven Unified School District

Conley-Caraballo High School, Hayward
James Logan High School, Union City

Newark Unified School District

Newark Memorial High School

Oakland Unified School District

Bay Area Technology School (charter school)
Castlemont High School
Fremont High School
McClymonds High School
Oakland High School
Oakland International High School
Oakland Military Institute (charter school)
Oakland School for the Arts
Oakland Technical High School
Skyline High School
University Preparatory Charter Academy

Piedmont Unified School District

Millennium High School
Piedmont High School

Pleasanton Unified School District

Amador Valley High School
Foothill High School
Horizon High School
Village High School

San Leandro Unified School District

Lincoln High School (continuation)
San Leandro High School

San Lorenzo Unified School District

Arroyo High School
San Lorenzo High School

Private schools 
Roman Catholic Diocese of Oakland, various cities in the East Bay
Bishop O'Dowd High School, Oakland
Holy Names High School, Oakland
Moreau Catholic High School, Hayward
St. Elizabeth High School, Oakland
St. Joseph Notre Dame High School, Alameda
St. Mary's College High School, Albany
Alameda Community Learning Center, Alameda
Averroes High School, Fremont
The College Preparatory School, Oakland
Head-Royce School, Oakland
Maybeck High School, Berkeley
The Quarry Lane School, Dublin
Valley Christian School, Dublin

Alpine County

Bear Valley High School, Bear Valley
Woodfords High School, Markleeville

Amador County

Amador County Unified School District
Amador High School, Sutter Creek
Argonaut High School, Jackson

Butte County

Biggs Unified School District

Biggs High School, Biggs

Chico Unified School District

Chico High School, Chico
Pleasant Valley High School, Chico

Durham Unified School District

Durham High School, Durham

Gridley Unified School District

Gridley High School, Gridley

Oroville Union High School District

Las Plumas High School, Oroville
Oroville High School, Oroville

Paradise Unified School District

Paradise High School, Paradise

Private schools or continuation schools 
Esperanza High School, Gridley
Fair View High School, Chico
Prospect High School, Oroville
Ridgeview High School, Magalia

Calaveras County

Arnold High School, Arnold
Bret Harte Union High School, Angels Camp
Calaveras High School, San Andreas
Copper Cove High School, Copperopolis

Colusa County

Colusa High School, Colusa
Maxwell High School, Maxwell
Pierce High School, Sudhir
Williams High School, Williams

Contra Costa County

Acalanes Union High School District

Acalanes High School, Lafayette
Campolindo High School, Moraga
Las Lomas High School, Walnut Creek
Miramonte High School, Orinda

Antioch Unified School District

Antioch High School, Antioch
Deer Valley High School, Antioch
Dozier-Libbey Medical High School, Antioch

John Swett Unified School District

John Swett High School, Crockett

Liberty Union High School District

Freedom High School, Oakley
Heritage High School, Brentwood
Liberty High School, Brentwood

Martinez Unified School District

Alhambra High School, Martinez

Mount Diablo Unified School District

College Park High School, Pleasant Hill
Concord High School, Concord
Mount Diablo High School, Concord
Northgate High School, Walnut Creek
Ygnacio Valley High School, Concord

Pittsburg Unified School District

Pittsburg High School, Pittsburg

San Ramon Valley Unified School District

California High School, San Ramon
Dougherty Valley High School, San Ramon
Monte Vista High School, Danville
San Ramon Valley High School, Danville

West Contra Costa Unified School District

De Anza High School, Richmond
El Cerrito High School, El Cerrito
Hercules High School, Hercules
Kennedy High School, Richmond 
Middle College High School (San Pablo), San Pablo
Pinole Valley High School, Pinole
Richmond High School, Richmond

Alternative or continuation schools 
Bidwell High School, Antioch
Black Diamond High School, Pittsburg
Del Amigo High School, Danville
Independence High School, Brentwood
La Paloma High School, Brentwood
Live Oak High School, Antioch
Prospects High School, Antioch
Vicente Martinez High School, Martinez
Vista High School, San Pablo
Willow High School, Crockett

Private schools 
The Athenian School, Danville
Berean Christian High School, Walnut Creek
Carondelet High School, Concord
Christ the King Catholic School, Pleasant Hill
De La Salle High School, Concord
Delta Christian Junior/Senior High School, Antioch
El Sobrante Christian School, El Sobrante
Holden High School, Orinda
Orinda Academy, Orinda
Pleasant Hill Adventist Academy, Pleasant Hill
Salesian College Preparatory, Richmond

Del Norte County

Del Norte High School, Crescent City

El Dorado County

Black Oak Mine Unified School District

Golden Sierra High School, Garden Valley

El Dorado Union High School District

El Dorado High School, Placerville
Oak Ridge High School, El Dorado Hills
Ponderosa High School, Shingle Springs
Union Mine High School, El Dorado

Lake Tahoe Unified School District

South Tahoe High School, South Lake Tahoe

Alternative or continuation schools 
Divide High School, Georgetown
Independence Continuation, Diamond Springs
Mt. Tallac High School, South Lake Tahoe

Private schools 
El Dorado Adventist School, Placerville
Muir Charter School, Placerville
Shenandoah High School, El Dorado
Vista High School, Placerville

Fresno County

Central Unified School District

Central High School, Fresno
Justin Garza High School, Fresno

Clovis Unified School District

Buchanan High School, Clovis
Clovis East High School, Clovis
Clovis High School, Clovis
Clovis North High School, Fresno
Clovis West High School, Fresno

Coalinga-Huron Unified School District

Coalinga High School, Coalinga

Firebaugh-Las Deltas Unified School District

Firebaugh High School, Firebaugh

Fowler Unified School District

Fowler High School, Fowler

Fresno Unified School District

Bullard High School, Fresno
The Center for Advanced Research and Technology
Erma Duncan Polytechnical High School, Fresno
Edison High School, Fresno
Fresno High School, Fresno
Herbert Hoover High School, Fresno
McLane High School, Fresno
Phoenix Secondary, Fresno
Philip J. Patino High School of Entrepreneurship, Fresno
Roosevelt High School, Fresno
Sunnyside High School, Fresno
University High School, Fresno

Golden Plains Unified School District

Tranquillity High School, Tranquillity

Kerman Unified School District

Kerman High School, Kerman

Kings Canyon Unified School District

Orange Cove High School, Orange Cove
Reedley High School, Reedley

Kingsburg Joint Union High School District

Kingsburg High School, Kingsburg

Laton Joint Unified School District

Laton High School, Laton

Mendota Unified School District

Mendota High School, Mendota

Parlier Unified School District

Parlier High School, Parlier

Riverdale Joint Unified School District

Riverdale High School, Riverdale

Sanger Unified School District

Sanger High School, Sanger

Selma Unified School District

Selma High School, Selma

Sierra Unified School District

Sierra High School, Tollhouse

Washington Unified School District

Washington Union High School, Fresno

Alternative or continuation schools 
Cambridge High School, Coalinga
Cambridge High School, Fresno
Chestnut High School, Huron
Design Science High School, Fresno
Dewolf West High School, Fresno
Easton High School, Fresno
El Puente High School, Firebaugh
Elm High School, Fresno
Enterprise High School, Kerman
Gateway High School, Clovis
Heartland High School, Selma
Horizon High School, Riverdale
Kings Canyon High School, Dinuba
Kings River High School, Sanger
Oasis High School, Kingsburg
Pershing High School, Fresno
Rio Del Rey High School, Helm
San Joaquin Valley High School, Parlier

Private schools 
Ambassador Phillip V. Sanchez Public Charter, Fresno (Sunnyside)
Ambassador Phillip V. Sanchez Public Charter, Fresno (West Shaw)
Ambassador Phillip V. Sanchez Public Charter, Mendota
Ambassador Phillip V. Sanchez Public Charter, Parlier
Carter G. Woodson Public Charter School, Fresno
Caruthers High School, Caruthers
Charter Academy of Ambassador Phillip V. Sanchez, Fresno
Crescent View South Public Charter, Clovis
Crescent View South Public Charter, Fresno
Crescent View West Public Charter, Fresno
Fresno Prep Academy, Fresno
Immanuel High School, Reedley
New Millennium Charter School, Fresno
San Joaquin Memorial High School, Fresno
School of Unlimited Learning, Fresno

Glenn County

Elk Creek Junior-Senior High School, Elk Creek
Hamilton Union High School, Hamilton City
Orland High School, Orland
Princeton Junior-Senior High School, Princeton
Willows High School, Willows

Humboldt County

Eureka City Schools

Eureka High School, Eureka

Ferndale Unified School District

Ferndale High School, Ferndale

Fortuna Union High School District

Fortuna Union High School, Fortuna

Klamath-Trinity Unified School District

Hoopa Valley High School, Hoopa

Mattole Unified School District

Mattole Triple Junction High School, Petrolia

Northern Humboldt Union High School District

Arcata High School, Arcata
McKinleyville High School, McKinleyville

Southern Humboldt Joint Unified School District

South Fork High School, Miranda

Alternative or continuation schools 
Academy of the Redwoods, Fortuna
Captain John Continuation High School, Hoopa
East High School, Fortuna
Mad River High School, McKinleyville
Pacific Coast High School, Arcata
Zoe Barnum High School, Eureka

Private schools 
Humboldt Bay High School, Eureka
St. Bernard's High School, Eureka

Imperial County

Brawley Union High School District

Brawley Union High School, Brawley

Calexico Unified School District

Calexico High School, Calexico

Calipatria Unified School District

Calipatria High School, Calipatria

Central Union High School District

Central Union High School, El Centro
Southwest High School, El Centro

Coachella Valley Unified School District

West Shores High School, Salton City

Holtville Unified School District

Holtville High School, Holtville

Imperial Unified School District

Imperial High School, Imperial

San Pasqual Valley Unified School District

San Pasqual Valley High School, Winterhaven

Alternative or continuation schools 
Aurora High School, Calexico
Bill M. Manes High School, Winterhaven
De Anza High School, Calexico
Desert Oasis High School, El Centro
Desert Valley High School, Brawley
Imperial Ave. Holbrook High School, Imperial
Sam Webb Continuation, Holtville

Private schools 
North County High School, Brawley
Vincent Memorial High School (Catholic), Calexico

Inyo County

Big Pine High School, Big Pine
Bishop High School, Bishop
Death Valley Academy, Shoshone
Lone Pine High School, Lone Pine
Owens Valley High School, Independence

Kern County

Delano Joint Union High School District

Cesar E. Chavez High School, Delano
Delano High School, Delano
Robert F. Kennedy High School, Delano

El Tejon Unified School District

Frazier Mountain High School, Lebec

Kern High School District

Arvin High School, Arvin
Bakersfield High School, Bakersfield
Centennial High School, Bakersfield
East Bakersfield High School, Bakersfield
Foothill High School, Bakersfield
Frontier High School, Bakersfield
Golden Valley High School, Bakersfield
Highland High School, Bakersfield
Independence High School, Bakersfield
Kern Valley High School, Lake Isabella
Kern Workforce 2000 Academy, Bakersfield
Liberty High School, Bakersfield
Mira Monte High School, Bakersfield
North High School, Bakersfield
Ridgeview High School, Bakersfield
Shafter High School, Shafter
South High School, Bakersfield
Stockdale High School, Bakersfield 
West High School, Bakersfield

Maricopa Unified School District

Maricopa High School, Maricopa

McFarland Unified School District

McFarland High School, McFarland

Mojave Unified School District

California City High School, California City
Mojave High School, Mojave

Muroc Joint Unified School District

Boron Junior-Senior High School, Boron
Desert Junior/Senior High School, Edwards

Sierra Sands Unified School District

Burroughs High School, Ridgecrest

Southern Kern Unified School District

Rosamond High School, Rosamond

Taft Union High School District

Taft Union High School, Taft

Tehachapi Unified School District

Tehachapi High School, Tehachapi

Wasco Union High School District

Wasco High School, Wasco

Alternative or continuation schools 
Buena Vista High School (continuation), Taft
Central Valley High School, Bakersfield
Mesquite High School, Ridgecrest
Monroe High School, Tehachapi
Nueva High School, Lamont
Rare Earth High School, Rosamond
San Joaquin High School, McFarland
Tierra Del Sol High School, Bakersfield
Valley High School, Delano
Vista High School, Bakersfield
Vista West High School, Bakersfield
Wasco Independence High School, Wasco

Private schools 
Bakersfield Christian High School, Bakersfield
Garces Memorial High School, Bakersfield

Kings County

Avenal High School, Avenal
Corcoran High School, Corcoran
Crescent Valley Public Charter, Hanford
Hanford High School, Hanford
Hanford West High School, Hanford
Earl F. Johnson Continuation School, Hanford
Kings Community School, Hanford
Lemoore High School, Lemoore
Lemoore Middle College High School, Lemoore
Sierra Pacific High School, Hanford
Armona Union Academy, Armona

Lake County

Clear Lake High School, Lakeport
Intermountain High School, Cobb
Kelseyville High School, Kelseyville
Lower Lake High School, Lower Lake
Middletown High School, Middletown
Upper Lake High School, Upper Lake

Lassen County

Big Valley High School, Bieber
Herlong High School, Herlong
Lassen High School, Susanville
Westwood High School, Westwood

Los Angeles County

Madera County

Chowchilla Union High School, Chowchilla
Evergreen High School, Oakhurst
Glacier High School Charter, Oakhurst
Madera High School, Madera
Madera South High School, Madera
Minarets High School, O'Neals
Mountain Oaks High School, North Fork
Pioneer Technical Center, Madera
Yosemite High School, Oakhurst

Marin County

Novato Unified School District

Novato High School, Novato
San Marin High School, Novato

San Rafael City Schools

San Rafael High School, San Rafael
Terra Linda High School, San Rafael

Shoreline Unified School District

Tomales High School, Tomales

Tamalpais Union High School District

Archie Williams High School, San Anselmo
Redwood High School, Larkspur
Tamalpais High School, Mill Valley

Alternative or continuation schools 
Madrone High School, San Rafael
Marin Oaks High School, Novato
San Andreas High School, Larkspur
Tamiscal High School, Larkspur

Private schools 
The Branson School, Ross
Marin Academy, San Rafael
Marin Catholic High School, Kentfield
North Bay Christian Academy, Novato
San Domenico School, San Anselmo

Mariposa County

Coulterville High School, Coulterville
Mariposa County High School, Mariposa
Yosemite Park High School, Yosemite

Mendocino County

Anderson Valley Unified School District

Anderson Valley Junior-Senior High School, Boonville

Fort Bragg Unified School District

Fort Bragg High School, Fort Bragg

Laytonville Unified School District

Laytonville High School, Laytonville

Leggett Valley Unified School District

Leggett Valley High School, Leggett
Whale Gulch High School, Whitethorn

Mendocino Unified School District

Mendocino High School, Mendocino

Point Arena Joint Union High School District

Point Arena High School, Point Arena

Potter Valley Community Unified School District

Potter Valley High School, Potter Valley

Round Valley Unified School District

Round Valley High School, Covelo

Ukiah Unified School District

Ukiah High School, Ukiah

Willits Unified School District

Willits High School, Willits

Alternative or continuation schools 
Centerville High School, Potter Valley
Noyo High School, Fort Bragg
Laytonville Continuation High School, Laytonville
Mendocino Sunrise High School, Mendocino
Rancheria Continuation, Boonville
Round Valley Continuation, Covelo
Sanhedrin High School, Willits
South Coast High School, Point Arena
South Valley High School, Ukiah

Private schools 
Developing Virtue Secondary School, Ukiah
Pacific Community Charter High School, Point Arena
Redwood Academy of Ukiah, Ukiah
Willits Charter School, Willits
Yokayo Valley Charter High School, Ukiah

Merced County

Delhi Unified School District

Delhi High School, Delhi

Dos Palos Oro Loma Joint Unified School District

Dos Palos High School, Dos Palos

Gustine Unified School District

Gustine High School, Gustine

Hilmar Unified School District

Hilmar High School, Hilmar

Le Grand Union High School District

Le Grand High School, Le Grand

Los Banos Unified School District

Los Banos High School, Los Banos
Pacheco High School, Los Banos

Merced Union High School District

Atwater High School, Atwater
Buhach Colony High School, Atwater
El Capitan High School, Merced
Golden Valley High School, Merced
Livingston High School, Livingston
Merced High School, Merced

Alternative or continuation schools 
Colony Basic Skills Alternative High School, Hilmar
Granada High School, Le Grand
Independence High School, Merced
Irwin High School, Hilmar
Pioneer High School, Gustine
San Luis High School, Los Banos
Sequoia High School, Merced
Westside High School, South Dos Palos
Yosemite High School, Merced

Private schools 
Stone Ridge Christian High School, Merced
Valley High School, Atwater
Valley High School, Los Banos
Valley High School, Merced

Modoc County

Great Basin High School, Cedarville
Modoc High School, Alturas
Surprise Valley High School, Cedarville
Warner High School, Alturas

Mono County

Coleville High School, Coleville
Eastern Sierra Academy, Bridgeport
Lee Vining High School, Lee Vining
Mammoth High School, Mammoth Lakes

Monterey County

Carmel Unified School District

Carmel High School, Carmel

Gonzales Unified School District

Gonzales High School, Gonzales

Monterey Peninsula Unified School District

Marina High School, Marina
Monterey High School, Monterey
Seaside High School, Seaside

North Monterey County Unified School District

North Monterey County High School, Castroville

Pacific Grove Unified School District

Pacific Grove High School, Pacific Grove

Salinas Union High School District

Alisal High School, Salinas
Everett Alvarez High School, Salinas
North Salinas High School, Salinas
Salinas High School, Salinas

Soledad Unified School District

Soledad High School, Soledad

South Monterey County Joint Union High School District

Greenfield High School, Greenfield
King City High School, King City

Alternative or continuation schools 
Carmel Valley High School, Carmel
Central Coast High School, Seaside
Pinnacles High School, Soledad
Portola-Butler High School, King City
Somavia High School, Gonazles

Private schools 
Cypress Grove Charter High School for Arts and Science, Carmel (closed in 2006)
Notre Dame High School, Salinas
Palma School, Salinas
Santa Catalina School, Monterey
Stevenson School, Pebble Beach
Trinity Christian High School, Monterey
York School, Monterey

Napa County

Calistoga Joint Unified School District

Calistoga High School, Calistoga

Napa Valley Unified School District

American Canyon High School, American Canyon
Napa High School, Napa
Vintage High School, Napa

St. Helena Unified School District

St. Helena High School, St. Helena

Alternative or continuation schools 
Legacy High School, American Canyon
New Technology High School, Napa
Palisades High School, Calistoga
Valley Oak High School, Napa

Private schools 
Justin-Siena High School, Napa
Pacific Union College Prep School, Angwin

Nevada County

Bear River High School, Grass Valley
Bitney College Preparatory High School, Grass Valley
Ghidotti Early College High School, Grass Valley
Nevada Union High School, Grass Valley
Sierra Mountain High School, Grass Valley
Tahoe-Truckee High School, Truckee

Orange County

Placer County

Placer Union High School District

Colfax High School, Colfax
Del Oro High School, Loomis
Foresthill High School, Foresthill
Placer High School, Auburn

Rocklin Unified School District

Rocklin High School, Rocklin
Whitney High School, Rocklin

Roseville Joint Union High School District

Antelope High School, Antelope
Granite Bay High School, Granite Bay
Oakmont High School, Roseville
Roseville High School, Roseville
West Park High School, Roseville
Woodcreek High School, Roseville

Tahoe-Truckee Unified School District

North Tahoe High School, Tahoe City

Western Placer Unified School District

Lincoln High School, Lincoln

Alternative or continuation schools 
Adelante High School, Roseville
Confluence High School, Auburn
Independence High School, Roseville
Victory High School, Rocklin

Private schools 
Forest Lake Christian High School, Auburn
Horizon Charter School, Lincoln
Pine Hills Adventist Academy, Auburn
Sierra Christian High School, Rocklin
Squaw Valley Academy, Squaw Valley
Western Sierra Collegiate Academy, Rocklin

Plumas County

Chester High School, Chester
Greenville Junior-Senior High School, Greenville
Pine Hills Adventist School
Portola High School, Portola
Quincy High School, Quincy

Riverside County

Alvord Unified School District

Hillcrest High School, Riverside
La Sierra High School, Riverside
Norte Vista High School, Riverside

Banning Unified School District

Banning High School, Banning

Beaumont Unified School District

Beaumont High School, Beaumont

Coachella Valley Unified School District

Coachella Valley High School, Thermal
Desert Mirage High School, Thermal
West Shores High School, Salton City/Mecca

Corona-Norco Unified School District

Centennial High School, Corona
Corona High School, Corona
Eleanor Roosevelt High School, Eastvale
John F. Kennedy Middle College High School, Norco
Norco High School, Norco
Santiago High School, Corona

Desert Sands Unified School District

Indio High School, Indio
La Quinta High School, La Quinta
Palm Desert High School, Palm Desert
Shadow Hills High School, Indio

Hemet Unified School District

Hamilton High School, Anza
Hemet High School, Hemet
Tahquitz High School, Hemet
West Valley High School, Hemet
Western Center Academy, Hemet

Jurupa Unified School District

Jurupa Valley High School, Jurupa Valley
Patriot High School, Jurupa Valley
Rubidoux High School, Jurupa Valley

Lake Elsinore Unified School District

Elsinore High School, Wildomar
Lakeside High School, Lake Elsinore
Temescal Canyon High School, Lake Elsinore

Moreno Valley Unified School District

Canyon Springs High School, Moreno Valley
Moreno Valley High School, Moreno Valley
Valley View High School, Moreno Valley
Vista del Lago High School, Moreno Valley

Murrieta Valley Unified School District

Murrieta Mesa High School, Murrieta
Murrieta Valley High School, Murrieta
Vista Murrieta High School, Murrieta

Palm Springs Unified School District

Cathedral City High School, Cathedral City
Desert Hot Springs High School, Desert Hot Springs
Palm Springs High School, Palm Springs
Rancho Mirage High School, Rancho Mirage

Palo Verde Unified School District

Palo Verde Valley High School, Blythe

Perris Union High School District

Heritage High School, Menifee
Liberty High School, Menifee
Paloma Valley High School, Menifee
Perris High School, Perris

Riverside Unified School District

Arlington High School, Riverside
John W. North High School, Riverside
Martin Luther King Jr. High School, Riverside
Ramona High School, Riverside
Polytechnic High School, Riverside

San Jacinto Unified School District

San Jacinto Senior High School, San Jacinto

Temecula Valley Unified School District

Chaparral High School, Temecula
Great Oak High School, Temecula
Temecula Valley High School, Temecula

Val Verde Unified School District

Citrus Hill High School, Perris
Orange Vista High School, Perris
Rancho Verde High School, Moreno Valley

Alternative or continuation schools 
Abraham Lincoln High School, Riverside
Alvord High School, Riverside
Amistad High School, Indio
Horizon School of Independent Studies, La Quinta
La Familia High School, Thermal
Lee Pollard High School, Corona
March Mountain High School, Moreno Valley
Mount San Jacinto High School, Cathedral City
Nueva Vista Continuation High School, Riverside
Orange Grove High School, Corona
Ortega High School, Lake Elsinore
Perris Lake High School, Perris
Raincross High School, Riverside
Rancho Vista High School, Temecula
Summit High School (independent studies), La Quinta
Summit View High School, Riverside
Sunnymead High School, Moreno Valley
Susan H. Nelson High School, Temecula
Twin Palms High School, Blythe
Val Verde High School, Perris

Private schools 
California Lutheran High School, Wildomar
Calvary Chapel Christian School, Murrieta
Christian School of the Desert, Bermuda Dunes
Desert Adventist Academy, Desert Hot Springs
Desert Chapel High School, Palm Springs
Eagle Mountain (K-12) School, Desert Center
Grace Chapel of the Desert School, Indio
Idyllwild Arts Academy, Idyllwild
La Sierra Adventist Academy, Riverside
Linfield Christian School, Temecula
Mater Dei High School, Mecca
Mesa Grande Academy, Calimesa
Mojave Desert (Mission Creek) Military Academy, Desert Hot Springs
Notre Dame Catholic High School, Riverside
Nuview Bridge Academy, Nuevo
Palm Valley High School (private), Rancho Mirage
Quadrille Academy, Indio
Rancho Christian School, Temecula
River Springs Charter School, County wide charter school
San Gorgonio (K-12) School, Cabazon
Seaview High School, Thermal/Mecca
Sherman Indian High School, Riverside
Southwest Educational Center, Wildomar
Temecula Preparatory School, French Valley
The Ranch Academy, 1000 Palms
Vista Calimesa High School, Calimesa/Yucaipa
Woodcrest Christian School, Riverside
Xavier College Preparatory (Catholic), Palm Desert

Sacramento County

Center Unified School District

Center High School, Antelope

Elk Grove Unified School District

Cosumnes Oaks High School, Elk Grove
Elk Grove Charter School, Elk Grove
Elk Grove High School, Elk Grove
Florin High School, South Sacramento
Franklin High School, Elk Grove
Laguna Creek High School, Elk Grove
Monterey Trail High School, Elk Grove
Pleasant Grove High School, Elk Grove
Sheldon High School, Sacramento
Valley High School, South Sacramento

Folsom Cordova Unified School District

Cordova High School, Rancho Cordova
Folsom High School, Folsom
Vista del Lago High School, Folsom

Galt Joint Union High School District

Galt High School, Galt
Liberty Ranch High School, Galt

Natomas Unified School District

Inderkum High School, Sacramento
Natomas Charter School, Sacramento
Natomas High School, Sacramento

River Delta Unified School District

Delta High School, Clarksburg
Rio Vista High School, Rio Vista

Sacramento City Unified School District

American Legion High School, Central Sacramento
Arthur A. Benjamin Health Professions High School, Sacramento
C.K. McClatchy High School, Sacramento
George Washington Carver School of Arts and Science, Sacramento
Hiram W. Johnson High School, Sacramento
John F. Kennedy High School, South Sacramento
Luther Burbank High School, Sacramento
The Met Sacramento High School, Sacramento
Rosemont High School, Sacramento
Sacramento Accelerated Academy High School, Sacramento
Sacramento High School, Sacramento
Sacramento New Technology High School, Sacramento
School of Engineering and Sciences, Sacramento
West Campus High School, West Sacramento

San Juan Unified School District

Bella Vista High School, Fair Oaks
Casa Roble High School, Orangevale
Del Campo High School, Fair Oaks
El Camino Fundamental High School, Arden-Arcade
Encina High School, Arden-Arcade
Mesa Verde High School, Citrus Heights
Mira Loma High School, Arden-Arcade
Rio Americano High School, Arden-Arcade
San Juan High School, Citrus Heights

Twin Rivers Unified School District

Foothill High School, Sacramento
Grant Union High School, North Sacramento
Highlands High School, North Highlands
Rio Linda High School, Rio Linda

Alternative or continuation schools 
Calvine High School, Sacramento
Discovery High School, Sacramento
Estrellita High School, Galt
Kinney High School, Rancho Cordova
Las Flores High School, Sacramento
McClellan High School, Antelope
Mokelumne High School, Courtland
Rio Cazadero High School, Sacramento
William Daylor High School, Sacramento

Private schools 
Christian Brothers High School, Central Sacramento
East Anthwood Angles High School, East Sacramento
East Side High School, East Sacramento
Franklin D. Roosevelt School, Sacramento
Golden Valley Charter School
Jane Lathrop School, Carmichael
Jesuit High School of Sacramento, Carmichael
K. Robinson Anthwood Continuation High School, East Sacramento
Lexington Union High School, Central Sacramento
Loretto High School, Sacramento
Lutheran School, Sacramento
River Valley School, Sacramento
Rochester High School, East Sacramento
Sacramento Adventist Academy, Sacramento
Sacramento Country Day School, Sacramento
Sacramento Preparatory Academy, Sacramento
Sacramento Valley School, Sacramento
Sacramento Waldorf School, Fair Oaks
St. Francis High School, Sacramento
Tahaloma High School, Citrus Heights
Upper Valley High School, East Sacramento
Valley Oak Academy - Mariposa, Citrus Heights
Victory Christian High School, Carmichael
Vista Nueva Career & Technology High School, Sacramento
West Heights High School, West Sacramento
Wizbin High School, East Sacramento

San Benito County

Anzar High School, San Juan Bautista
San Benito High School, Hollister

San Bernardino County

Apple Valley Unified School District

Apple Valley High School, Apple Valley
Granite Hills High School, Apple Valley

Barstow Unified School District

Barstow High School, Barstow

Bear Valley Unified School District

Big Bear High School, Big Bear City

Chaffey Joint Union High School District

Alta Loma High School, Rancho Cucamonga
Chaffey High School, Ontario
Colony High School, Ontario
Etiwanda High School, Rancho Cucamonga
Los Osos High School, Rancho Cucamonga
Montclair High School, Montclair
Ontario High School, Ontario
Rancho Cucamonga High School, Rancho Cucamonga

Chino Valley Unified School District

Chino High School, Chino
Chino Hills High School, Chino Hills
Don Antonio Lugo High School, Chino
Ruben S. Ayala High School, Chino Hills

Colton Joint Unified School District

Bloomington High School, Bloomington
Colton High School, Colton
Grand Terrace High School, Grand Terrace

Fontana Unified School District

A. B. Miller High School, Fontana
Fontana High School, Fontana
Henry J. Kaiser High School, Fontana
Jurupa Hills High School, Fontana
Summit High School, Fontana

Hesperia Unified School District

Hesperia High School, Hesperia
Oak Hills High School, Oak Hills
Sultana High School, Hesperia

Morongo Unified School District

Twentynine Palms High School, Twentynine Palms
Yucca Valley High School, Yucca Valley

Needles Unified School District

Needles High School, Needles

Redlands Unified School District

The Grove School, Redlands
Citrus Valley High School, Redlands
Redlands East Valley High School, Redlands
Redlands High School, Redlands

Rialto Unified School District

Dwight D. Eisenhower High School, Rialto
Rialto High School, Rialto
Wilmer Amina Carter High School, Rialto

Rim of the World Unified School District

Rim of the World High School, Lake Arrowhead

San Bernardino City Unified School District

Arroyo Valley High School, San Bernardino
Cajon High School, San Bernardino
Indian Springs High School, San Bernardino
Pacific High School, San Bernardino
San Bernardino High School, San Bernardino
San Gorgonio High School, San Bernardino

Silver Valley Unified School District

Silver Valley High School, Yermo

Snowline Joint Unified School District

Serrano High School, Phelan

Upland Unified School District

Upland High School, Upland

Victor Valley Union High School District

Adelanto High School, Adelanto
Cobalt Institute of Math & Science, Victorville
Lakeview Leadership Academy, Victorville
Silverado High School, Victorville
University Preparatory School, Victorville
Victor Valley High School, Victorville

Yucaipa-Calimesa Joint Unified School District

Yucaipa High School, Yucaipa

Alternative or continuation schools 
Big Bear STEM School, Big Bear City
Black Rock High School, Joshua Tree
Boys Republic High School, Chino Hills
Buena Vista Continuation High School, Chino
Calico Continuation High School, Yermo
Canyon Ridge High School, Hesperia
Canyon View High School, Ontario
Central High Continuation School, Barstow
Chaparral High School, Phelan
Chautauqua High School, Big Bear City
Citrus High School, Fontana
Doctor John H. Milor High School, Rialto
Eric Birch High School, Fontana
Goodwill High School, Victorville
Green Valley High School, Yucaipa
Hillside High School, Upland
Mountain High School, Lake Arrowhead
Mojave Desert Public School, Amboy
Mojave High School, Hesperia
Orangewood Contintuation High School, Redlands
San Andreas High School, San Bernardino
Sierra High School, San Bernardino
Slover Mountain High School, Colton
Valley View High School, Ontario
Washington Alternative High School, Colton
Zupanic High School, Rialto

Private schools 
Alta Vista Public Charter, Adelanto
Alta Vista Public Charter, Apple Valley
Alta Vista Public Charter, Hesperia
Alta Vista Public Charter, San Bernardino
Alta Vista South Public Charter, Highland
Aquinas Catholic High School, San Bernardino
Arrowhead Christian Academy, Redlands
Big River School, Big River (county)
Bloomington Christian School, Big Bear Lake
Bloomington Christian School, Bloomington
Crestline High School, Crestline
Desert Sands Charter High School, Fontana
Desert Sands Charter High School, Rialto
Grace Chapel of the Desert School, Yucca Valley
Loma Linda Academy, Loma Linda
Mesa Grande Academy, Calimesa/Yucaipa
Mojave Desert (Morongo Basin) Military Academy, Yucca Valley
Riverside Prep, Oro Grande
(Seventh-Day) Adventist Academy, Yucca Valley/Twentynine Palms
(Seventh-Day) Adventist Academy, Yucaipa/Calimesa
Upland Christian Academy, Rancho Cucamonga
Xavier College Preparatory High School, Palm Desert

San Diego County

San Francisco County

Public
Abraham Lincoln High School
Academy of Arts & Sciences
Balboa High School
Downtown High School
Galileo Academy of Science and Technology
George Washington High School
Ida B. Wells Continuation High School
Independence High School
International Studies Academy
John A. O'Connell High School
June Jordan School for Equity
Lowell High School
Mission High School
Phillip & Sala Burton High School
Raoul Wallenberg Traditional High School
San Francisco Flex Academy
San Francisco International High School
School of the Arts (SOTA)
Thurgood Marshall Academic High School

Public charter
City Arts & Technology
Gateway High School
KIPP San Francisco College Preparatory
Leadership High School

Private schools 
 The Bay School of San Francisco
 Drew School
 Fusion Academy
 International High School of San Francisco
 Jewish Community High School of the Bay
 Lick-Wilmerding High School
 Lycée Français La Pérouse
 Proof School
 Saint John of San Francisco Orthodox Academy
 San Francisco Christian
 San Francisco University High School
 San Francisco Waldorf High School
 The Urban School of San Francisco
 Woodside International School
 Youth Chance High School

Catholic
 Archbishop Riordan High School
 Convent of the Sacred Heart High School
 Immaculate Conception Academy
 Mercy High School (closed)
 Sacred Heart Cathedral Preparatory
 St. Ignatius College Preparatory
 Stuart Hall High School

San Joaquin County

Escalon Unified School District

Escalon High School, Escalon

Lammersville Joint Unified School District

Mountain House High School, Mountain House

Lincoln Unified School District

Lincoln High School, Stockton

Linden Unified School District

Linden High School, Linden

Lodi Unified School District

Bear Creek High School, Stockton
Lodi High School, Lodi
Middle College High School, Stockton
Ronald E. McNair High School, Stockton
Tokay High School, Lodi

Manteca Unified School District

East Union High School, Manteca
Lathrop High School, Lathrop
Manteca High School, Manteca	
Sierra High School, Manteca
Weston Ranch High School, Stockton

Ripon Unified School District

Ripon High School, Ripon

Stockton Unified School District

Cesar Chavez High School, Stockton
Edison High School, Stockton
Franklin High School, Stockton
Health Careers Academy, Stockton
Pacific Law Academy, Stockton
Stagg High School, Stockton
Stockton Early College Academy, Stockton
Weber Institute of Applied Sciences and Technology, Stockton

Tracy Unified School District

John C. Kimball High School, Tracy
Merrill F. West High School, Tracy
Tracy High School, Tracy

Alternative or continuation schools 
Calla High School, Manteca
Duncan-Russell Continuation, Tracy
George and Evelyn Stein Continuation, Tracy		
Harvest High School, Ripon
Jane Frederick High School, Stockton
Liberty High School, Lodi
New Vision Alternative High School, Stockton
Plaza Robles Continuation High, Stockton
Pride Continuation, Linden
Village Oaks High School, Stockton
Vista High School, Escalon

Private schools 
Edward C. Merlo Institute of Environmental Studies, Stockton
Lodi Academy, Lodi
Manteca Day School, Manteca
St. Mary's High School, Stockton

San Luis Obispo County

Atascadero Unified School District

Atascadero High School, Atascadero

Coast Unified School District

Coast Union High School, Cambria

Lucia Mar Unified School District

Arroyo Grande High School, Arroyo Grande
Central Coast New Tech High School, Nipomo
Nipomo High School, Nipomo

Paso Robles Joint Unified School District

Paso Robles High School, Paso Robles

San Luis Coastal Unified School District

Morro Bay High School, Morro Bay
San Luis Obispo High School, San Luis Obispo

Shandon Joint Unified School District

Shandon High/Middle School, Shandon

Templeton Unified School District

Templeton High School, Templeton

Alternative or continuation schools 
Eagle Canyon High School, Templeton
Independence High School, Paso Robles
Leffingwell Continuation High School, Cambria
Liberty High School, Paso Robles
Lopez High School, Arroyo Grande
Pacific Beach High School, San Luis Obispo
Paloma Creek High School, Atascadero

Private schools 
Grizzly Challenge Charter School, San Luis Obispo
Mission College Preparatory, San Luis Obispo
North County Christian High School, Atascadero
San Luis Obispo Classical Academy, San Luis Obispo

San Mateo County

Cabrillo Unified School District

Half Moon Bay High School, Half Moon Bay

Jefferson Union High School District

Jefferson High School, Daly City
Oceana High School, Pacifica
Terra Nova High School, Pacifica
Westmoor High School, Daly City

La Honda-Pescadero Unified School District

Pescadero Middle and High School, Pescadero

San Mateo Union High School District

Aragon High School, San Mateo
Burlingame High School, Burlingame
Capuchino High School, San Bruno
Design Tech High School, Redwood Shores
Hillsdale High School, San Mateo
Mills High School, Millbrae
San Mateo High School, San Mateo

Sequoia Union High School District

Carlmont High School, Belmont
Everest Public High School, Redwood City
Menlo-Atherton High School, Atherton
Sequoia High School, Redwood City
Summit Preparatory Charter High School, Redwood City
Woodside High School, Woodside

South San Francisco Unified School District

Baden High School, South San Francisco
El Camino High School, South San Francisco
South San Francisco High School, South San Francisco

Private
Aurora High School, Redwood City
Crystal Springs Uplands School, Hillsborough
East Palo Alto Phoenix Academy, East Palo Alto
Eastside College Preparatory School, East Palo Alto
German-American International School, Menlo Park
Junípero Serra High School, San Mateo
Menlo School, Atherton
Mercy High School (Burlingame, California), Burlingame
Mid-Peninsula High School, Menlo Park
Notre Dame High School, Belmont
The Nueva School, Hillsborough
Pacific Rim International School, San Mateo
Shiloh United School, South San Francisco
Sacred Heart Prep, Atherton
Woodside Priory School, Portola Valley

Santa Barbara County

Carpinteria Unified School District

Carpinteria High School, Carpinteria

Cuyama Joint Unified School District

Cuyama Valley High School, New Cuyama

Lompoc Unified School District

Cabrillo High School, Lompoc
Lompoc High School, Lompoc

Santa Barbara Unified School District

Dos Pueblos High School, Goleta
San Marcos High School, Santa Barbara
Santa Barbara High School, Santa Barbara

Santa Maria Joint Union High School District

Ernest Righetti High School, Santa Maria
Pioneer Valley High School, Santa Maria
Santa Maria High School, Santa Maria

Santa Ynez Valley Union High School District

Santa Ynez Valley Union High School, Santa Ynez

Alternative or continuation schools 
Alta Vista High School, Santa Barbara
Delta High School, Santa Maria
Foothill High School, Carpinteria
La Cuesta High School, Santa Barbara
Maple High School (continuation), Lompoc
Refugio High School, Santa Ynez
Rincon High School, Carpinteria
Sierra Madre High School, New Cuyama

Private schools 
The Anacapa School, Santa Barbara
Bishop Garcia Diego High School, Santa Barbara
Cate School, Carpinteria
Laguna Blanca School, Santa Barbara
Lion of Judah Christian Academy, Orcutt
Los Angeles Catholic Archdiocese 

Midland School, Los Olivos
St. Joseph High School, Santa Maria
Valley Christian Academy, Santa Maria

Santa Clara County

Campbell Union High School District

Boynton High School, San Jose
Branham High School, San Jose
Del Mar High School, San Jose
Leigh High School, San Jose
Prospect High School, Saratoga
Stellar Learning Academy, Campbell
Westmont High School, Campbell

East Side Union High School District

Andrew P. Hill High School, San Jose
East Side Cadet Academy, San Jose
Evergreen Valley High School, San Jose
Independence High School, San Jose
James Lick High School, San Jose
MACSA Academia Calmecac School, San Jose
Mount Pleasant High School, San Jose
Oak Grove High School, San Jose
Piedmont Hills High School, San Jose
San Jose Conservation Corps Charter School, San Jose
Santa Teresa High School, San Jose
Silver Creek High School, San Jose
William C. Overfelt High School, San Jose
Yerba Buena High School, San Jose

Fremont Union High School District

Cupertino High School, Cupertino
Fremont High School, Sunnyvale
Homestead High School, Cupertino
Lynbrook High School, San Jose
Monta Vista High School, Cupertino

Gilroy Unified School District

Christopher High School, Gilroy
Dr. TJ Owens Gilroy Early College Academy (GECA), Gilroy
Gilroy High School, Gilroy
MACSA Elementary Portal Leadership Academy, San Jose

Los Gatos-Saratoga Joint Union High School District

Los Gatos High School, Los Gatos
Saratoga High School, Saratoga

Milpitas Unified School District

Milpitas High School, Milpitas

Morgan Hill Unified School District

Ann Sobrato High School, Morgan Hill
Live Oak High School, Morgan Hill

Mountain View-Los Altos Union High School District

Los Altos High School, Los Altos
Mountain View High School, Mountain View
Silicon Valley Essential High School, Los Altos

Palo Alto Unified School District

Gunn High School, Palo Alto
Palo Alto High School, Palo Alto

Roman Catholic Diocese of San Jose

Archbishop Mitty High School, San Jose
Bellarmine College Preparatory, San Jose
Notre Dame High School, San Jose
Presentation High School, San Jose
Saint Francis High School, Mountain View

San Jose Unified School District

Abraham Lincoln High School, San Jose
Downtown College Prep, San Jose
Gunderson High School, San Jose
Leland High School, San Jose
Middle College High School, San Jose
Pioneer High School, San Jose
San Jose High Academy, San Jose
Willow Glen High School, San Jose

Santa Clara Unified School District

Adrian C. Wilcox High School, Santa Clara
Kathleen MacDonald High School, San Jose (opens in 2022)
Santa Clara High School, Santa Clara

Private Schools 
Beacon School, San Jose
BASIS Independent Silicon Valley, San Jose
Cambrian Academy, San Jose
Castilleja School, Palo Alto
Communitas Charter High School, San Jose
The Harker School, San Jose
Kehillah Jewish High School, Palo Alto
The King's Academy, Sunnyvale
Liberty Baptist School, San Jose
Mountain View Academy, Mountain View, Seventh-Day Adventist
Oakwood High School, Morgan Hill
Our Shepherd's Academy, San Jose
Palo Alto Preparatory School, Palo Alto
Phoenixonian Institute, San Jose (1861–c. 1901)
Pine Hill School, San Jose
Pinewood School, Los Altos Hills
Thomas More School, San Jose
University Preparatory Academy, San Jose
Valley Christian High School, San Jose
White Road Baptist Academy, San Jose

Santa Cruz County

Pajaro Valley Unified School District

Aptos High School, Aptos
Pajaro Valley High School, Watsonville
Watsonville High School, Watsonville

San Lorenzo Valley Unified School District

San Lorenzo Valley High School, Felton

Santa Cruz City School District

Harbor High School, Santa Cruz
Santa Cruz High School, Santa Cruz
Soquel High School, Soquel

Scotts Valley Unified School District

Scotts Valley High School, Scotts Valley

Alternative or continuation schools 
Costanoa Continuation High School, Santa Cruz
Renaissance High School, La Selva Beach

Private schools 
Cypress Charter High School, Live Oak
Delta Charter School, Santa Cruz
Georgiana Bruce Kirby Preparatory School, Santa Cruz
MCP Middle and High School (Monterey Coast Prep), Santa Cruz
Monte Vista Christian School, Watsonville
Monterey Bay Academy, Watsonville
Pacific Collegiate School, Santa Cruz
Saint Francis Central Coast Catholic High School, Watsonville
Santa Cruz Waldorf High School, Santa Cruz

Shasta County

Anderson Union High School District

Anderson New Technology High School, Anderson
Anderson Union High School, Anderson
West Valley High School, Cottonwood

Fall River Joint Unified School District

Burney High School, Burney
Fall River High School, McArthur

Gateway Unified School District

Central Valley High School, Shasta Lake

Shasta Union High School District

Enterprise High School, Redding
Foothill High School, Palo Cedro
Shasta High School, Redding

Alternative or continuation schools 
Freedom High School, Redding
Mountain Lakes High School, Shasta Lake
Mountain View High School, Burney
North Independence High School, Redding
North Valley High School, Anderson
Oakview High School, Anderson
Pioneer Continuation High School, Redding
Soldier Mountain High School, McArthur

Private schools 
Bishop Quinn High School, Palo Cedro
Liberty Christian High School, Redding
Nawa Academy, French Gulch
Redding Christian High School, Redding
Stellar Charter School, Redding
University Preparatory School, Redding

Sierra County

Downieville School, Downieville
Loyalton High School, Loyalton
Pliocene Ridge Junior-Senior High School, North San Juan

Siskiyou County

Butte Valley High School, Dorris
Cascade High School, Dorris
Dunsmuir High School, Dunsmuir
Etna High School, Etna
Scott River High School, Etna
Golden Eagle Charter School, Mount Shasta
Siskiyou Union High School District
Happy Camp High School, Happy Camp
Jefferson High School, Mount Shasta
McButt High School, McButt
Mount Shasta High School, Mount Shasta
Weed High School, Weed
Tulelake Continuation High School, Tulelake
Tulelake High School, Tulelake
Discovery High School, Yreka
Yreka High School, Yreka

Solano County

Benicia Unified School District

Benicia High School, Benicia

Dixon Unified School District

Dixon High School, Dixon

Fairfield-Suisun Unified School District

Angelo Rodriguez High School, Fairfield
Armijo High School, Fairfield
Fairfield High School, Fairfield

River Delta Unified School District

Rio Vista High School, Rio Vista

Travis Unified School District

Vanden High School, Fairfield

Vacaville Unified School District

Vacaville High School, Vacaville
Will C. Wood High School, Vacaville

Vallejo City Unified School District

Jesse M. Bethel High School, Vallejo
Vallejo High School, Vallejo

Alternative or continuation schools 
Country High School, Vacaville
John Finney High School, Vallejo
Liberty High School, Benicia
Maine Prairie High School, Dixon
Sem Yeto High School, Fairfield

Private schools 
Buckingham Charter Magnet High School, Vacaville
Mare Island Technology Academy, Vallejo
Mary Bird School, Fairfield
St. Patrick-St. Vincent High School, Vallejo
Vacaville Christian High School, Vacaville

Sonoma County

Cloverdale Unified School District

Cloverdale High School, Cloverdale

Cotati-Rohnert Park Unified School District

Rancho Cotate High School, Rohnert Park
Technology High School, Rohnert Park

Geyserville Unified School District

Geyserville Educational Park High School, Geyserville

Healdsburg Unified School District

Healdsburg High School, Healdsburg

Petaluma City Schools

Casa Grande High School, Petaluma
Petaluma High School, Petaluma

Santa Rosa City Schools

Elsie Allen High School, Santa Rosa
Maria Carrillo High School, Santa Rosa
Montgomery High School, Santa Rosa
Piner High School, Santa Rosa
Santa Rosa High School, Santa Rosa

Sonoma Valley Unified School District

Sonoma Valley High School, Sonoma

West Sonoma County Union High School District

Analy High School, Sebastopol
El Molino High School, Forestville

Windsor Unified School District

Windsor High School, Windsor

Alternative or continuation schools 
Carpe Diem High School, Petaluma
Creekside High School, Sonoma
El Camino High School, Rohnert Park
Johanna Hanson-Echols High School, Cloverdale
North Bay Met Academy, Windsor
Ridgway High School, Santa Rosa
San Antonio High School, Petaluma
Sonoma Mountain High School, Petaluma
Valley Oaks High School, Petaluma
Windsor Oaks Academy, Windsor

Private schools 
Cardinal Newman High School, Santa Rosa
Journey High School, Sebastopol
Nonesuch High School, Sebastopol
Rincon Valley Christian School, Santa Rosa
Rio Lindo Adventist Academy, Healdsburg
Roseland University Prep, Santa Rosa
Russian River Charter School, Forestville
St. Vincent de Paul High School, Petaluma
Sonoma Academy, Santa Rosa
 Summerfield Waldorf High School, Santa Rosa
Ursuline High School, Santa Rosa

Stanislaus County

Ceres Unified School District

Central Valley High School, Ceres 	
Ceres High School, Ceres
Whitmore Charter High School, Ceres

Denair Unified School District

Denair High School, Denair

Hughson Unified School District

Hughson Union High School, Hughson, Hughson

Modesto City Schools

Fred C. Beyer High School, Modesto
Grace M. Davis High School, Modesto
James C. Enochs High School, Modesto
Joseph Gregori High School, Modesto
Modesto High School, Modesto
Peter Johansen High School, Modesto
Thomas Downey High School, Modesto

Newman-Crows Landing Unified School District

Orestimba High School, Newman

Oakdale Joint Unified School District

Oakdale High School, Oakdale

Patterson Joint Unified School District

Patterson High School, Patterson

Riverbank Unified School District

Riverbank High School, Riverbank

Turlock Unified School District

John H. Pitman High School, Turlock
Turlock High School, Turlock

Waterford Unified School District

Waterford High School, Waterford

Alternative or continuation schools 
Adelante High School, Riverbank
Argus High School, Ceres
Del Puerto High School, Patterson
East Stanislaus High School, Oakdale
Roselawn High School, Turlock
Sentinel High School, Waterford
Valley Business High School, Modesto
Valley Oak High School, Oakdale
West Side Valley High School, Newman

Private schools 
Big Valley Grace Christian High School, Modesto	
Brethren Heritage School, Modesto
Central Catholic High School, Modesto
Community Middle College, Modesto 	 	
Keyes to Learning Charter School, Keyes 	
Modesto Christian High School, Modesto 	 	 	 		
Turlock Christian High School, Turlock

Sutter County

East Nicolaus High School, Nicolaus
Faith Christian Junior-Senior High School, Yuba City
Live Oak High School, Live Oak
River Valley High School, Yuba City 
Sutter Union High School, Sutter
Yuba City High School, Yuba City

Tehama County

Corning High School, Corning
Los Molinos High School, Los Molinos
Mercy High School, Red Bluff
Red Bluff High School, Red Bluff

Trinity County

Hayfork High School, Hayfork
Southern Trinity High School, Mad River (address in Bridgeville in Humboldt County)
Trinity High School, Weaverville

Tulare County

Alpaugh Unified School District

Alpaugh Senior High School, Alpaugh

Cutler-Orosi Unified School District

Orosi High School, Orosi

Dinuba Unified School District

Dinuba High School, Dinuba

Exeter Unified School District

Exeter Union High School, Exeter

Farmersville Unified School District

Farmersville High School, Farmersville

Lindsay Unified School District

Lindsay High School, Lindsay

Porterville Unified School District

Butterfield Charter High School, Porterville
Granite Hills High School, Porterville
Harmony Magnet Academy High School, Porterville
Monache High School, Porterville
Porterville High School, Porterville
Strathmore High School, Porterville

Tulare Joint Union High School District

Mission Oak High School, Tulare
Tulare Union High School, Tulare
Tulare Western High School, Tulare

Visalia Unified School District

El Diamante High School, Visalia
Golden West High School, Visalia
Mount Whitney High School, Visalia
Redwood High School, Visalia

Woodlake Unified School District

Woodlake High School, Woodlake

Alternative or continuation schools 
Bravo Lake High School, Woodlake
Citrus High School, Porterville
Deep Creek Academy, Farmersville
Esperanza High School, Cutler
John C. Cairns Continuation, Lindsay
Kaweah High School, Exeter
Lovell High School, Cutler
Sequoia High School, Visalia
Sierra Vista High School, Dinuba
Tulare Technical Preparatory High School, Tulare 
Tule Continuation, Alpaugh

Private schools 
Burton Pathways Charter High School, Porterville
Central Valley Christian High School, Visalia
Crescent Valley Public Charter, Tulare
Crescent Valley Public Charter, Visalia
La Sierra High School, Visalia
Porterville Military Academy, Porterville
Prospect Education Center, Porterville
Summit Charter Collegiate High School, Porterville
University Preparatory High School, Visalia
Vine Street Community School, Porterville

Tuolumne County

Cold Springs High School, Tuolumne
Mountain High School, Pinecrest
Sonora High School, Sonora
Southfork High School, Tuolumne
Summerville Union High School, Tuolumne
Tioga High School, Groveland

Ventura County

Conejo Valley Unified School District

Newbury Park High School, Newbury Park
Thousand Oaks High School, Thousand Oaks
Westlake High School, Westlake Village

Fillmore Unified School District

Fillmore High School, Fillmore

Moorpark Unified School District

The High School at Moorpark College, Moorpark
Moorpark High School, Moorpark

Oak Park Unified School District

Oak Park High School, Oak Park

Ojai Unified School District
Nordhoff High School, Ojai

Oxnard Union High School District

Adolfo Camarillo High School, Camarillo
Channel Islands High School, Oxnard
Del Sol High School, Oxnard (opens in 2022)
Hueneme High School, Oxnard
Oxnard High School, Oxnard
Pacifica High School, Oxnard
Rancho Campana High School, Camarillo
Rio Mesa High School, Oxnard

Santa Paula Unified School District

Santa Paula High School, Santa Paula

Simi Valley Unified School District

Royal High School, Simi Valley
Santa Susana High School, Simi Valley
Simi Valley High School, Simi Valley

Ventura Unified School District

Buena High School, Ventura
Foothill Technology High School, Ventura
Ventura High School, Ventura

Alternative or continuation schools 
Apollo High School, Simi Valley
Chaparral High School, Ojai
Community High School, Moorpark
Conejo Valley High School, Thousand Oaks
El Camino High School, Ventura
Frontier High School, Camarillo
Oak View High School, Oak Park
Pacific High School, Ventura
Renaissance High School, Santa Paula
Sierra High School, Fillmore

Private schools 
Besant Hill School (formerly Happy Valley School), Ojai
Cornerstone Christian School, Camarillo
Grace Brethren High School Simi Valley
La Reina High School, Thousand Oaks
Los Angeles Catholic Archdiocese

Mary B. Perry High School, Camarillo
Newbury Park Adventist Academy, Newbury Park
St. Bonaventure High School, Ventura
Santa Clara High School, Oxnard
The Thacher School, Ojai
Ventura County Christian School, Ventura 
Villanova Preparatory School, Ojai
Vista Real Charter High School, Oxnard
Vista Real Charter High School, Santa Paula
Vista Real Charter High School, Simi Valley
Vista Real Charter High School, Ventura
Weil Tennis Academy & College Prep School, Ojai

Yolo County

Cache Creek High School (Continuation), Yolo
Davis Senior High School, Davis
Delta High School, Clarksburg
Esparto High School, Esparto
Leonardo da Vinci High School, Davis
Martin Luther King High, Davis
Pioneer High School, Woodland
River City High School, West Sacramento
Winters High School, Winters
Woodland High School, Woodland

Yuba County

Lindhurst High School, Olivehurst
Marysville Charter Academy for the Arts, Marysville
Marysville High School, Marysville
New Life Christian School, Linda
Wheatland High School, Wheatland
Core Charter School, Marysville

See also
List of school districts in California
List of closed secondary schools in California

References

External links
List of high schools in California from SchoolTree.org
High schools in California

 
High schools
California high schools